"The Letter" is a 1992 single by Wayne Newton from his album Moods & Moments. The song peaked at number one on Cashbox's Top 100 Country Singles chart in July 1992 and took an additional five months to reach number one on Cashbox's Top 100 Pop Singles chart in December 1992. Although the song peaked at number one in Cashbox, "The Letter" did not appear in any of Billboard's charts and was not mentioned at all by Billboard.

Background
In a 1991 interview with Ralph Emery on Nashville Now, Newton revealed that "The Letter" was based on a discarded note written by Elvis Presley in 1976 during his final stay at the Las Vegas Hilton. Years after Presley's death, Newton bought Presley's note in June 1991 at a Sotheby's auction for $13,200. Newton wrote "The Letter" after receiving requests to provide copies of Presley's note to his fans. In the lyrics for "The Letter", Newton sings about Elvis's loneliness and includes a word for word reading of Elvis's note that he bought at Sotheby's.

Reception
Cash Box said Newton transformed "The Letter" from a fan favorite to a religious awakening.

Chart performance
On July 11, 1992, "The Letter" peaked at number one on the Cashbox Top 100 Country Singles chart. After remaining on the Cashbox Top 100 Pop Singles chart for almost six months, "The Letter" reached number one on December 12, 1992. Despite peaking at number one in Cashbox, "The Letter" did not chart on any Billboard chart, though it was reviewed by the magazine and did appear on Billboard's music-videos Clip List for a few months, as TNN (The Nashville Network) listed it among its rotation of videos.

Music video
In 1992, Newton released a music video for "The Letter". In the music video, Newton performs at  The Hilton and reads out Elvis's note.

See also
List of Cash Box Top 100 number-one singles of 1992

References

Songs about letters (message)
1992 singles
Wayne Newton songs
Number-one singles in the United States